Luis Medina Montoya (born June 21, 1952) is a retired middle distance runner from Cuba, who represented his native country at the 1976 Summer Olympics in Montreal, Quebec, Canada. He is best known for winning the gold medal in the men's 800 metres event at the 1975 Pan American Games in Mexico City, Mexico.

References

 

1952 births
Living people
Cuban male long-distance runners
Cuban male middle-distance runners
Olympic athletes of Cuba
Athletes (track and field) at the 1976 Summer Olympics
Pan American Games gold medalists for Cuba
Pan American Games bronze medalists for Cuba
Pan American Games medalists in athletics (track and field)
Athletes (track and field) at the 1975 Pan American Games
Athletes (track and field) at the 1979 Pan American Games
Central American and Caribbean Games gold medalists for Cuba
Central American and Caribbean Games silver medalists for Cuba
Competitors at the 1974 Central American and Caribbean Games
Competitors at the 1978 Central American and Caribbean Games
Competitors at the 1982 Central American and Caribbean Games
Central American and Caribbean Games medalists in athletics
Medalists at the 1975 Pan American Games